Enrique "Kikin" Collazo (born 5 October 1988 in Adjuntas) is a professional boxer from Puerto Rico who competed for the 2012 Olympics as a middleweight (75 kg).

Enrique was a quarter-finalist and 5th-place finisher at middleweight at the 2012 American Boxing Olympic Qualification Tournament.  Five spots were available for qualification at middleweight and Enrique qualified over the other quarter-finalists since his loss was to the eventual winner Terrell Gausha.  Qualification being dependent on how the opponent performed in later rounds was controversial and will not be used in future Olympics.

Enrique won the gold medal at the 2010 Central American and Caribbean Games.

At the 2012 Summer Olympics, Collazo was defeated in the first round by the German Stefan Hartel with a score of 18-10.

References

External links

Living people
Middleweight boxers
Boxers at the 2012 Summer Olympics
Olympic boxers of Puerto Rico
Puerto Rican male boxers
1988 births
People from Adjuntas, Puerto Rico
Central American and Caribbean Games gold medalists for Puerto Rico
Competitors at the 2010 Central American and Caribbean Games
Central American and Caribbean Games medalists in boxing